Neosho State Fishing Lake, also known as Lake McKinley is located in the state of Kansas. Construction of this lake was completed in 1927. There are 124 public use acres surrounding the lake. Fishing, camping, and picnicking are popular activities. The park has a shelter house, fishing piers, picnic tables, barbecue grills and vault toilets. Below Lake McKinley dam is a catch and release youth fishing pond for anglers age 15 and under when with an accompanying adult. The lake is operated by the Kansas Department of Wildlife and Parks.

The lake was named for Marshall Coleman McKinley, a conservationist and resident of Parsons who served as president of the local chapter of the Izaak Walton League and who successfully petitioned the Kansas State Fish, Game and Forestry Commission (now the Kansas Department of Wildlife and Parks) to construct the lake and establish a fish hatchery there.

References

External links
 Kansas Department of Wildlife and Parks: Neosho State Fishing Lake

Reservoirs in Kansas
Kansas state fishing lakes
Protected areas of Neosho County, Kansas
Bodies of water of Neosho County, Kansas